The India-Pakistan border (or Indo–Pakistani border) is the international boundary that separates the nations of the Republic of India and the Islamic Republic of Pakistan. At its northern end is the Line of Control, which separates Indian-administered Kashmir from Pakistani-administered Kashmir; and at its southern end is Sir Creek, a tidal estuary in the Rann of Kutch between the Indian state of Gujarat and the Pakistani province of Sindh.

Arising from the partition of British India in 1947, the border covers the provincial boundaries of Gujarat and Rajasthan with Sindh, and the Radcliff Line between the partitions of Punjab. It traverses a variety of terrain in the northwestern region of the subcontinent, ranging from major urban areas to inhospitable deserts. Since the beginning of the India–Pakistan conflict shortly after the two countries' conjoined independence, it has been the site of numerous cross-border military standoffs and full-scale wars. The border's total length is  according to figures given by the PBS; it is also ranked as one of the most dangerous international boundaries in the world, based on an article written in Foreign Policy in 2011. During the nighttime, the India–Pakistan border is distinctly visible from outer space due to the 150,000 floodlights installed by India on approximately 50,000 poles.

Section distinction

The border between the two nations is an internationally recognised frontier from Gujarat/Sindh only with exemption to the Line of Control that is not internationally accepted. The disputed region of Kashmir got divided through the Indo-Pakistani War of 1947 into the regions of Pakistan-administered Kashmir and Indian-administered Kashmir. The UN-mediated ceasefire line of 1949 served as the de facto border between the two regions, which was revised to a Line of Control after the Indo-Pakistani War of 1971.

The border between Indian-administered Kashmir and the Pakistani province of Punjab is officially called the "Working Boundary" by the UN. India regards it as the international border.

Sections of the India–Pakistan border from north to south:

 Line of Control (LoC): De facto boundary between Indian-administered Kashmir and Pakistani-administered Kashmir. Its current form was demarcated after the 1972 Simla Agreement.
 Working Boundary: Separates Punjab, Pakistan from Indian-administered Jammu and Kashmir. It is referred to as a working boundary by the UN; Pakistani Punjab is internationally recognized as part of Pakistan by both parties while Jammu and Kashmir is a disputed territory (claimed by Pakistan, controlled by India).
 International Boundary (IB): The demarcated line between the Republic of India and the Islamic Republic of Pakistan, recognized by both sides internationally.

Border crossings

 ICP Border crossings with designated Integrated Check Posts (ICP) with immigration and customs facilities are:
Attari and Wagah is the most famous and prominent border crossing point between India and Pakistan due to Wagah-Attari border ceremony. The crossing is located 32 kilometres from Amritsar and 24 kilometers from Lahore.
 Munabao: This village situated at Barmer district in Rajasthan, is famous for the railway station through which, the Thar Express connecting India with Pakistan runs. The crossing point had been closed after the Indo-Pakistani War of 1965. In February 2006 it was reopened and since then the Thar Express operates from Bhagat Ki Kothi in Jodhpur, India to Karachi, Pakistan.
 Other crossings 
 Ganda Singh Wala border, Kasur District (Pakistan side) / Hussainiwala border, Punjab (India side) 
 Sulaimanki, Punjab (Pakistan side) / Fazilka border, Okara District (India side) 
 Longewala (closed)

Border ceremonies 

At the following border crossing sites the beating retreat flag ceremonies are jointly held by the military of both nations every day at 6 pm, which are open to public as tourist attractions. No special permit or ticket is needed. The ceremony sites are as follows (from north to south):

  Punjab, India - Punjab, Pakistan
 Wagah - Attari border ceremony near Amritsar in Punjab.
 Hussainiwala - Ganda Singh Wala border ceremony near Firozepur in Punjab.
 Sadiqui - Sulemanki border ceremony near Fazilka in Punjab.
  Rajasthan - Sindh
 Munabao - Khokhrapar border ceremony in Barmer district in Rajasthan.

Wagah–Attari border ceremony 

The flag lowering ceremony at the village of Wagah is held each evening immediately before sunset by the border agents of Pakistan (Pakistan Rangers) and India (Border Security Force or BSF). It is a tradition dating back to 1959. The ceremony begins with battle calls from both sides in the form of loud screaming done by the border guards. This is followed by a series of organized high kicks, stomps, and dance moves during which the opposing forces stare each other down. The event ends with a handshake of good faith being exchanged by the head guards along with the lowering of the flags. The crowd cheers and claps enthusiastically through it all. The ritual is known to attract international tourists and even celebrities. It is symbolic of the brotherhood as well as the rivalry that these two nations share. The border troops are known to exchange sweets with the opposing side during the Muslim holidays of Eid and Hindu holiday of Diwali, but in 2016 and 2018 the BSF have avoided doing so due to rising military tensions. It has been a peaceful gathering with the exception of the 2014 Wagah border suicide attack in which 60 people were killed and over 110 people were left injured. It has also been cancelled on occasion such as when Pakistan returned Wing Commander Abhinandan Varthaman back to India after his plane was shot down by the Pakistan Air Force (PAF) during the 2019 India-Pakistan standoff.

Similar border ceremonies held by India (Border Security Force, BSF) and Pakistan (Pakistan Rangers) occur at Fazilka border (India side) / Sulaimanki, Punjab and Hussainiwala border, Punjab (India side) / Ganda Singh Wala border, Kasur District (Pakistan side). These rituals are attended primarily by the local villagers and garner very few spectator tourists.

Gallery

See also 
 Borders of India
Borders of Pakistan
Partition of India
 Radcliffe Line
 India–Pakistan relations
 India–Pakistan border skirmishes

References

External links
 
 
 International Boundary Study No. 86 – 2 December 1968 India – Pakistan Boundary

 
Borders of India
Borders of Pakistan
International borders
Border